Bibiano Fernandes da Silva Neto (born March 30, 1980) is a Brazilian professional mixed martial artist and black belt Brazilian jiu-jitsu (BJJ) practitioner.

A five time World jiu-jitsu champion and three time Pan American champion, Fernandes was considered the top light-featherweight of his generation before transitioning to mixed martial arts (MMA). 

Fernandes has competed for K-1, DREAM, ONE Championship and King of the Cage. He was the first DREAM Featherweight Champion and DREAM Bantamweight Champion,  ONE Bantamweight Champion. He was once ranked as the #5 Bantamweight in the world by MMA Weekly and Fight Matrix as well as the #1 bantamweight outside of the UFC As of March 6, 2023, he is ranked #3 in the ONE Bantamweight rankings.

Background
Fernandes was born in Manaus and grew up in a neighborhood called Coroado with his family. Fernandes played soccer throughout his childhood. Due to an unhappy relationship, Fernandes' mother became depressed and eventually passed away for an unknown reason when he was seven. His father, Inacio, didn't want to raise the children, so Bibiano and his siblings were sent to live with their aunt in the Amazon rainforest, by the Ituxi River. However, Bibiano caught malaria during their stay in the rainforest and his father was alerted to bring him back to Manaus for treatment. After returning to Manaus, Fernandes attended school for the first time in his life at the age of nine.

MMA career
At the age of 13, Bibiano was introduced to BJJ, but coming from a poor family he was unable to pay for training. His instructor said he'd continue to train him, as long as he cleaned the gym after the class. This gave Bibiano a profound respect and gratitude for the gym and what it taught. Bibiano says that he'd say to himself when he was a child "good job! You held your ground and believed what you believed."

Early career
Fernandes fought against world-class competition early in his MMA career. In his second professional fight, Fernandes lost due to a doctor's stoppage to Urijah Faber in a King of the Cage event in Nevada.  After dominating the first 2 minutes of the round, even taking Faber's back, he was reversed and received a barrage of elbows that opened up a deep cut on his forehead.  Though the fight was officially ruled a doctor stoppage, it was actually stopped by the referee, due to the cut. In his very next fight, Fernandes lost to Norifumi "Kid" Yamamoto at a K-1 Hero's event in Japan. After losing to Faber and Yamamoto, Fernandes won four consecutive fights before entering into the DREAM Featherweight Grand Prix.

DREAM
Bibiano defeated Joe Warren and Hiroyuki Takaya at DREAM 11 to win the DREAM Featherweight Grand Prix and become the first DREAM Featherweight Champion. After defeating Warren by first round armbar, Fernandes' fight against Takaya was very close, and he won by split decision.

Fernandes fought former DREAM Lightweight Champion Joachim Hansen on March 22, 2010, at DREAM 13 for his first title defense. He won the match in a split decision.  At K-1 Dynamite!! 2010, Fernandes had a rematch with Takaya for the DREAM featherweight championship. Fernandes lost his title to Takaya via unanimous decision.

Fernandes next faced Takafumi Otsuka at DREAM 17 in the quarterfinals of the bantamweight tournament. He won the fight via submission in the first round. At Fight For Japan: Genki Desu Ka Omisoka 2011, he defeated Rodolfo Marques via unanimous decision in the semifinal round. In the finals, Fernandes defeated Antonio Banuelos via TKO in the first round to win the Dream World Bantamweight Grand Prix and become the first ever DREAM Bantamweight champion.

Ultimate Fighting Championship
On June 4, 2012, it was announced that Fernandes had signed with the UFC and was briefly linked to a bout against Roland Delorme on July 21, 2012, at UFC 149.  However, the UFC claimed Fernandes pulled out of the bout, citing an injury.  Bibiano subsequently clarified that he had been in negotiations with the UFC, but a contract was never signed.

ONE Championship
In June 2012 it was announced that Fernandes had signed with ONE Championship instead of the UFC.

Fernandes made his debut for the promotion at ONE FC 5 against Gustavo Falciroli. He won the fight via unanimous decision.

Interim ONE Bantamweight Championship
Fernandes next fight was at ONE FC 9: Rise to Power against Koetsu Okazaki for the Interim ONE Bantamweight Championship. He won via unanimous decision.

Undisputed ONE Bantamweight Championship
Fernandes next fought at ONE FC 11: Total Domination against Soo Chul Kim to unify the ONE Bantamweight Championship. He won the bout via unanimous decision and became the undisputed champion.

Fernandes headlined ONE Fighting Championship: Rise of Heroes on May 2, 2014, against Masakatsu Ueda.  He won via unanimous decision.

Bibiano faced Dae Hwan Kim at ONE Fighting Championship: Warrior's Way on December 5, 2014, once again successfully defending his world title by defeating Kim via rear-naked choke in the second round.

In his fourth title defense, Fernandes faced Kevin Belingon at ONE Championship: Dynasty of Champions on January 23, 2016. He successfully defended his title, winning by kimura submission in the first round.

In his fifth title defense, Fernandes faced Reece McLaren at ONE Championship: Age of Domination on December 2, 2016.  He won the fight by split decision.

On February 17, 2017, it was announced that Fernandes re-signed with ONE Championship.

Title loss and second reign
Fernandes fought Kevin Belingon for the second time at ONE Championship 78: Heart of the Lion on November 9, 2018, in a title unification bout. He lost the fight via split decision.

Fernandes faced Belingon in a trilogy match at ONE Championship: A New Era on March 30, 2019. He won the bout via disqualification when he could not continue after Belingon landed an illegal elbow to the back of Fernandes's head, once again regaining the bantamweight title.

Fernandes faced Belingon for the fourth time at ONE Championship: Century on October 13, 2019. He won the fight via a rear-naked choke submission in the second round.

Fernandes was scheduled to face John Lineker at ONE: X on December 3, 2021. However due to the pandemic, the event was postponed and the bout was moved to ONE: Bad Blood on February 11, 2022. Lineker tested positive for COVID days before the event and the bout was pulled. The bout was rescheduled for ONE: Lights Out on March 11, 2022. Fernandes lost the title by second-round knockout.

Fernandes faced Stephen Loman on November 19, 2022, at ONE on Prime Video 4. At weigh-ins, the pair failed to make weight in the bantamweight division and agreed to compete in the 153.25 lbs catchweight. He lost the fight via unanimous decision.

Personal life
Fernandes and his wife, Amanda, have three sons: Elijah, Gabriel and Lucas.

Brazilian jiu-jitsu lineage
Mitsuyo "Count Koma" Maeda → Carlos Gracie, Sr. → Reyson Gracie → Osvaldo Alves → Faustino 'Pina' Neto → Bibiano Fernandes

Championships and accomplishments

Mixed martial arts
DREAM
DREAM Bantamweight Championship (One time; only)
DREAM 2011 Bantamweight World Grand Prix Champion
DREAM Featherweight Championship (One time; first)
One successful title defense
DREAM 2009 Featherweight World Grand Prix Champion
ONE Championship
Interim ONE Bantamweight Championship (One time)
ONE Bantamweight Championship (Two times)
Seven successful title defenses (first reign)
One successful title defense (second reign)
Most title defences in ONE Championship history (seven)
Most title defences in ONE Championship Bantamweight division (seven)
Sherdog
2011 All-Violence Second Team

Brazilian jiu-jitsu
International Brazilian Jiu-Jitsu Federation
2007 Pan American Jiu-Jitsu Championship Black Belt Bronze Medalist
2006 World Jiu-Jitsu Championship Black Belt Gold Medalist
2006 Pan American Jiu-Jitsu Championship Black Belt Gold Medalist
2005 World Jiu-Jitsu Championship Black Belt Gold Medalist
2005 Pan American Jiu-Jitsu Championship Black Belt Gold Medalist
2004 World Jiu-Jitsu Championship Black Belt Silver Medalist
2004 Pan American Jiu-Jitsu Championship Black Belt Gold Medalist
2003 World Jiu-Jitsu Championship Black Belt Gold Medalist
2003 Brazil National Jiu-Jitsu Championship Black Belt Gold Medalist
2002 World Jiu-Jitsu Championship Brown Belt Gold Medalist
2002 Brazil National Jiu-Jitsu Championship Brown Belt Gold Medalist
2001 Brazil National Jiu-Jitsu Championship Purple Belt Gold Medalist
1998 World Jiu-Jitsu Championship Blue Belt Bronze Medalist
1997 Brazil National Jiu-Jitsu Championship Blue Belt Gold Medalist

Mixed martial arts record

|-
|Loss
|align=center|24–6
|Stephen Loman
|Decision (unanimous)
|ONE on Prime Video 4
|
|align=center|3
|align=center|5:00
|Kallang, Singapore
|
|-
|Loss
|align=center|24–5
| John Lineker
| KO (punch)
| ONE: Lights Out
| 
|align=center|2
|align=center|3:40 
| Kallang, Singapore
|  
|-
| Win
| align=center|24–4
| Kevin Belingon
| Submission (rear-naked choke)
| ONE: Century Part 2
| 
| align=center|2
| align=center|2:16
| Tokyo, Japan
| 
|-
| Win
| align=center|23–4
| Kevin Belingon
| DQ (illegal elbows)
| ONE: A New Era
| 
| align=center| 3
| align=center| 3:40
| Tokyo, Japan
| 
|-
| Loss
| align=center|22–4
| Kevin Belingon
| Decision (split)
| ONE: Heart of the Lion
| 
| align=center| 5
| align=center| 5:00
| Kallang, Singapore
| 
|-
| Win
| align=center|22–3
| Martin Nguyen
| Decision (split)
| ONE: Iron Will
| 
| align=center| 5
| align=center| 5:00
| Bangkok, Thailand
| 
|-
| Win
| align=center|21–3
| Andrew Leone
| Submission (rear-naked choke)
| ONE: Kings & Conquerors
| 
| align=center| 1
| align=center| 1:47
| Macau, China
| 
|-
| Win
| align=center|20–3
| Reece McLaren
| Decision (split)
| ONE: Age of Domination
| 
| align=center| 5
| align=center| 5:00
| Pasay, Philippines
| 
|-
| Win
| align=center| 19–3
| Kevin Belingon
| Submission (kimura)
| ONE: Dynasty of Champions
| 
| align=center| 1
| align=center| 4:04
| Changsha, China
| 
|-
| Win
| align=center| 18–3
| Toni Tauru
| KO (punch)
| ONE: Kingdom of Warriors
| 
| align=center| 3
| align=center| 1:02
| Yangon, Myanmar
| 
|-
| Win
| align=center| 17–3
| Dae Hwan Kim
| Submission (rear-naked choke)
| ONE FC: Warrior's Way
| 
| align=center| 2
| align=center| 1:16
| Pasay, Philippines
| 
|-
| Win
| align=center| 16–3
| Masakatsu Ueda
| Decision (unanimous)
| ONE FC: Rise of Heroes
| 
| align=center| 5
| align=center| 5:00
| Pasay, Philippines
| 
|-
| Win
| align=center| 15–3
| Soo Chul Kim
| Decision (unanimous)
| ONE FC: Total Domination
| 
| align=center| 5
| align=center| 5:00
| Kallang, Singapore
| 
|-
| Win
| align=center| 14–3
| Koetsu Okazaki
| Decision (unanimous)
| ONE FC: Rise to Power
| 
| align=center| 5
| align=center| 5:00
| Pasay, Philippines
| 
|-
| Win
| align=center| 13–3
| Yoshiro Maeda
| Technical Submission (triangle choke)
| Dream 18
| 
| align=center| 1
| align=center| 1:46
| Tokyo, Japan
| 
|-
| Win
| align=center| 12–3
| Gustavo Falciroli
| Decision (unanimous)
| ONE FC: Pride of a Nation
| 
| align=center| 3
| align=center| 5:00
| Quezon City, Philippines
| 
|-
| Win
| align=center| 11–3
| Antonio Banuelos
| TKO (punches)
| Fight For Japan: Genki Desu Ka Omisoka 2011
| 
| align=center| 1
| align=center| 1:21
| Saitama, Japan
| 
|-
| Win
| align=center| 10–3
| Rodolfo Marques
| Decision (unanimous)
| Fight For Japan: Genki Desu Ka Omisoka 2011
| 
| align=center| 2
| align=center| 5:00
| Saitama, Japan
| 
|-
| Win
| align=center| 9–3
| Takafumi Otsuka
| Technical Submission (rear-naked choke)
| Dream 17
| 
| align=center| 1
| align=center| 0:41
| Saitama, Japan
| 
|-
| Loss
| align=center| 8–3
| Hiroyuki Takaya
| Decision (unanimous)
| Dynamite!! 2010
| 
| align=center| 3
| align=center| 5:00
| Saitama, Japan
| 
|-
| Win
| align=center| 8–2
| Joachim Hansen
| Decision (split)
| Dream 13 
| 
| align=center| 2
| align=center| 5:00
| Yokohama, Japan
| 
|-
| Win
| align=center| 7–2
| Hiroyuki Takaya
| Decision (split)
| Dream 11 
| 
| align=center| 2
| align=center| 5:00
| Yokohama, Japan
| 
|-
| Win
| align=center| 6–2
| Joe Warren
| Submission (armbar)
| Dream 11 
| 
| align=center| 1
| align=center| 0:42
| Yokohama, Japan
| 
|-
| Win
| align=center| 5–2
| Masakazu Imanari
| Decision (unanimous)
| Dream 9 
| 
| align=center| 2
| align=center| 5:00
| Yokohama, Japan
| 
|-
| Win
| align=center| 4–2
| Takafumi Otsuka
| Decision (unanimous)
| Dream 7 
| 
| align=center| 2
| align=center| 5:00
| Saitama, Japan
| 
|-
| Win
| align=center| 3–2
| Len Tam
| Submission (triangle choke)
| Raw Combat: Redemption
| 
| align=center| 1
| align=center| 0:58
| Calgary, Alberta, Canada
| 
|-
| Win
| align=center| 2–2
| Juan Barrantes
| Decision (unanimous)
| Raw Combat: Resurrection 
| 
| align=center| 3
| align=center| 5:00
| Calgary, Alberta, Canada
| 
|-
| Loss
| align=center| 1–2
| Norifumi Yamamoto
| Decision (unanimous)
| Hero's 10 
| 
| align=center| 3
| align=center| 5:00
| Kanagawa, Japan
| 
|-
| Loss
| align=center| 1–1
| Urijah Faber  	
| TKO (punches) 
| KOTC: All Stars
| 
| align=center| 1
| align=center| 4:16
| Reno, Nevada, United States
| 
|-
| Win
| align=center| 1–0
| Luis Figueroa
| Submission (rear-naked choke)
| Jungle Fight 3
| 
| align=center| 1
| align=center| 0:31
| Manaus, Brazil
|

See also
 List of current ONE fighters
 List of current mixed martial arts champions
 List of male mixed martial artists

Notes

References

External links
 Bibiano Fernandes at ONE
 

Living people
1980 births
People from Manaus
Brazilian people of indigenous peoples descent
Brazilian male mixed martial artists
Featherweight mixed martial artists
Mixed martial artists utilizing pankration
Mixed martial artists utilizing Brazilian jiu-jitsu
Dream (mixed martial arts) champions
Brazilian practitioners of Brazilian jiu-jitsu
People awarded a black belt in Brazilian jiu-jitsu
Brazilian expatriates in Canada
Sportspeople from Amazonas (Brazilian state)
ONE Championship champions
Brazilian jiu-jitsu practitioners who have competed in MMA (men)